Eliza Muradyan  (born January 16, 1993) is an Armenian-Russian model and beauty pageant titleholder who was crowned Miss Universe Armenia 2018. She represented Armenia at the Miss Universe 2018 pageant.

Personal life
Muradyan was born in Yerevan, Armenia where she currently resides. She is presently working to open an evening dress rental business. She used to live in Moscow, Russia, where she studied  Medical Science and graduated from the First Moscow State Medical University.  In 2013, Muradyan won Miss MGMU 2013 in Russia.

Pageantry

Miss Universe Armenia 2018
On 6 July 2018, Muradyan was crowned Miss Universe Armenia 2018, and became the first ever Armenian entrant in Miss Universe.

Miss Universe 2018
Muradyan represented Armenia at Miss Universe 2018 pageant where she failed to place in the Top 20.

References

External links
missarmenia.org
missuniverse.com

1993 births
Armenian beauty pageant winners
Armenian female models
Living people
Miss Universe 2018 contestants
Models from Yerevan
Armenian expatriates in Russia